Merče ( or) is a village in the Municipality of Sežana in the Littoral region of Slovenia.

The local church is dedicated to Saint Andrew and belongs to the Parish of Povir.

References

External links

Merče on Geopedia

Populated places in the Municipality of Sežana